The Amelia Island North Range Light was built to mark a channel over the sandbar at the mouth of the St. Mary's River, which led to the harbor at Fernandina Beach, Florida, on Amelia Island. It consisted of a lighthouse and a front range tower with a light, arranged so that when ships could see one light above the other, they were lined up with the channel. During the Civil War Confederate forces removed the lenses from the lights. Union forces seized Fernandina Beach, Fort Clinch and the lighthouse in 1862.

It is known that the front range tower was destroyed during the war. There is no record of when the lighthouse was destroyed, but a new lighthouse was built in 1872. As the channel over the sand bar shifted with time, the front range light was periodically moved to maintain an alignment with the channel. In 1887 the rear range light was moved from the lighthouse to a tramway to permit proper adjustments to be made to the alignment. The light was decommissioned in 1899 after the channel was sufficiently marked with buoys. The lighthouse was listed in a survey in 1924, but has since disappeared.

See also

 List of lighthouses in Florida
 List of lighthouses in the United States

References

External links
Florida Lighthouse Page - Amelia Island North Range Lighthouse History - accessed January 16, 2006, recovered using Wayback Machine on January 22, 2007

Lighthouses completed in 1858
Houses completed in 1858
Lighthouses completed in 1872
Houses completed in 1872
Lighthouses in Florida
Transportation buildings and structures in Nassau County, Florida
1858 establishments in Florida
1899 disestablishments in Florida
Amelia Island